"Go Gentle" is a song by British singer-songwriter Robbie Williams, released as the lead single from his tenth studio album Swings Both Ways (2013). The single was released in the United Kingdom on 10 November 2013. The song was written by Robbie Williams, Guy Chambers and Chris Heath.

Background
In an interview with Magic FM, Williams said that the song is a promise to his daughter Teddy. He said: "Go Gentle is a promise I'm making to my daughter. It was written when she first arrived on the planet and I'd been a selfish popstar for most of my life and then all of a sudden I've been asked to take care of this whole person. I still am scared that I'm not up to the task! I'm doing a good job of being a dad but it's scary, you have to look after this person for the whole of their life, I'm not very good at even looking after me handsome !".

Music video
A music video to accompany the release of "Go Gentle" was first released onto YouTube on 16 October 2013 at a total length of three minutes and fifty seconds. The video shows Williams dressed as a sea captain and performing the song on a parade float decorated as a wooden ship, backed by a band dressed as sailors, moving through the streets of downtown Los Angeles.

Critical reception
Lewis Corner of Digital Spy gave the song a positive review, stating:
 
"The singer's showmanship makes him a natural when it comes to the bravado and assurance of swing music [...] But with a classic whistle line, a smooth melody and Robbie's undiminished star quality, we're pretty certain 'Go Gentle' will stand the test of time to serve its true purpose."

Live performances
On 10 November 2013, Williams performed "Go Gentle" on the live results show of The X Factor.

Track listing

Charts and certifications

Weekly charts

Year-end charts

Certifications

Release history

References

2013 songs
Robbie Williams songs
Songs written by Robbie Williams
2013 singles
Songs written by Guy Chambers
Island Records singles
Song recordings produced by Guy Chambers
Songs written by Chris Heath